Piora is a genus of Papuasian plants in the tribe Astereae within the family Asteraceae.

Species
The only known species is Piora ericoides, native to the island of New Guinea.

References

Monotypic Asteraceae genera
Astereae
Endemic flora of New Guinea